James Clement (born 4 September 1976) is a former professional Australian rules footballer for Collingwood and Fremantle in the Australian Football League (AFL).  He was selected in the All-Australian Team on two occasions, represented Australia in the International Rules Series and was vice-captain of Collingwood.

Fremantle career
From South Fremantle, the Fremantle Dockers picked Clement up as a zone selection in the 1995 National Draft. His major role as a junior was as a half-back/winger, but he was used as a taller type defender throughout his AFL career. A regular starter since making his debut in 1996, his form slipped at senior level at the start of 1998, being omitted after the first match, but came back into the side as a tall forward option and surprised many, kicking 5 goals in consecutive games. He ended up kicking 27 goals for the season. He moved back to defence in 1999, he showed he was capable of playing as a utility. Only playing 8 games in 2000 and what seemed an unhappy relationship with coach Damian Drum, Clement was then traded to Collingwood.

Collingwood career
Clement thrived at Collingwood playing 20 games during 2001, but it was in 2002 that the Pies saw a champion player. During this time, he bulked up substantially.  Unlucky not to gain his first All-Australian selection, but played in the International Rules Series in Ireland at the end of the season. His strength as a defender, football brain and leadership qualities were shown. He helped the Pies through to a Grand Final and played all 25 games, including the last day in September. 2003 saw Clement miss several games mid-season with a hamstring injury, but he regained form at finals time and the vice-captain saw another Grand Final.

He had much more decorated seasons in 2004 and 2005, including All-Australian honours and the Copeland Trophy in each of the seasons, as the Pies finished in the bottom 4 in both seasons. He led the side for several matches in 2005 when Nathan Buckley and Anthony Rocca were missing from the team due to injury. In 2006, Clement was surprisingly not named in the All-Australian team, and finished equal second in the Copeland Trophy. In 2007, it was considered possible that Clement would take over the captaincy of the Collingwood side from Nathan Buckley, however he announced his surprise retirement at the end of the 2007 season. Later it was revealed he retired to support his wife Jeanne, who has autoimmune kidney failure.

Statistics

|- style="background-color: #EAEAEA"
! scope="row" style="text-align:center" | 1996
|style="text-align:center;"|
| 31 || 12 || 1 || 0 || 93 || 57 || 150 || 46 || 19 || 0.1 || 0.0 || 7.8 || 4.8 || 12.5 || 3.8 || 1.6
|-
! scope="row" style="text-align:center" | 1997
|style="text-align:center;"|
| 31 || 21 || 4 || 5 || 160 || 84 || 244 || 79 || 26 || 0.2 || 0.2 || 7.6 || 4.0 || 11.6 || 3.8 || 1.2
|- style="background-color: #EAEAEA"
! scope="row" style="text-align:center" | 1998
|style="text-align:center;"|
| 31 || 21 || 27 || 13 || 128 || 48 || 176 || 68 || 23 || 1.3 || 0.6 || 6.1 || 2.3 || 8.4 || 3.2 || 1.1
|-
! scope="row" style="text-align:center" | 1999
|style="text-align:center;"|
| 31 || 22 || 5 || 3 || 231 || 71 || 302 || 105 || 29 || 0.2 || 0.1 || 10.5 || 3.2 || 13.7 || 4.8 || 1.3
|- style="background-color: #EAEAEA"
! scope="row" style="text-align:center" | 2000
|style="text-align:center;"|
| 31 || 8 || 1 || 0 || 77 || 19 || 96 || 34 || 13 || 0.1 || 0.0 || 9.6 || 2.4 || 12.0 || 4.3 || 1.6
|-
! scope="row" style="text-align:center" | 2001
|style="text-align:center;"|
| 8 || 20 || 7 || 8 || 216 || 79 || 295 || 115 || 32 || 0.4 || 0.4 || 10.8 || 4.0 || 14.8 || 5.8 || 1.6
|- style="background-color: #EAEAEA"
! scope="row" style="text-align:center" | 2002
|style="text-align:center;"|
| 8 || 25 || 1 || 1 || 268 || 88 || 356 || 91 || 53 || 0.0 || 0.0 || 10.7 || 3.5 || 14.2 || 3.6 || 2.1
|-
! scope="row" style="text-align:center" | 2003
|style="text-align:center;"|
| 8 || 21 || 0 || 1 || 179 || 81 || 260 || 78 || 28 || 0.0 || 0.0 || 8.5 || 3.9 || 12.4 || 3.7 || 1.3
|- style="background-color: #EAEAEA"
! scope="row" style="text-align:center" | 2004
|style="text-align:center;"|
| 8 || 22 || 0 || 0 || 251 || 77 || 328 || 117 || 33 || 0.0 || 0.0 || 11.4 || 3.5 || 14.9 || 5.3 || 1.5
|-
! scope="row" style="text-align:center" | 2005
|style="text-align:center;"|
| 8 || 22 || 1 || 3 || 276 || 102 || 378 || 105 || 57 || 0.0 || 0.1 || 12.5 || 4.6 || 17.2 || 4.8 || 2.6
|- style="background-color: #EAEAEA"
! scope="row" style="text-align:center" | 2006
|style="text-align:center;"|
| 8 || 23 || 2 || 0 || 300 || 88 || 388 || 146 || 42 || 0.1 || 0.0 || 13.0 || 3.8 || 16.9 || 6.3 || 1.8
|-
! scope="row" style="text-align:center" | 2007
|style="text-align:center;"|
| 8 || 13 || 2 || 0 || 172 || 41 || 213 || 83 || 33 || 0.2 || 0.0 || 13.2 || 3.2 || 16.4 || 6.4 || 2.5
|- class="sortbottom"
! colspan=3| Career
! 230
! 51
! 34
! 2351
! 835
! 3186
! 1067
! 388
! 0.2
! 0.1
! 10.2
! 3.6
! 13.9
! 4.6
! 1.7
|}

References

External links 

James Clement at the Collingwood Football Club website 

Collingwood Football Club players
South Fremantle Football Club players
1976 births
Australian rules footballers from Perth, Western Australia
Living people
Fremantle Football Club players
Copeland Trophy winners
All-Australians (AFL)
Western Australian State of Origin players
Australia international rules football team players
Fremantle Football Club administrators
People educated at Scotch College, Perth